Herbert George Simms (30 November 189828 September 1948) was an English architect who worked as an architect for Dublin Corporation.

Early life and education
He was the eldest of six children of George William Simms, a train driver and former shepherd, originally of Fawley, Buckinghamshire and his wife Nellie (née Worster) originally of Hemel Hempstead. His father had four older children from a previous marriage.
He lived with the family on Prince of Wales Road, Kentish Town and was educated at the Haverstock Industrial and Commercial School. By 1911 the family had moved to 33 Victoria Road, with Herbert the oldest of the children still at home.

Military career
During the First World War he served in the Royal Field Artillery. He was awarded an ex-service scholarship of £150 and tuition fees which allowed him to study architecture at Liverpool University.

Architectural education
He began studies in October 1919 but had to abandon them for financial reasons when the three years ended. He had received the Certificate in Architecture in 1921 and passed the third and fourth years of the Diploma course. On grounds of previous office work and the standard of his studies he was permitted to sit the course for the Certificate in Civic Design which he was awarded in March 1923.

Architectural career
After university he moved to Dublin, where he worked for a while in the office of Aubrey Vincent O'Rourke. In February 1925 he was appointed temporary architect to Dublin Corporation , working under Horace Tennyson O'Rourke, a role that was gradually extended and lasted until December 1927. In 1926 he was authorised to visit London, Liverpool and Manchester to examine the latest developments in flats.

In 1932 or 1933 a separate housing architect's department was formed to focus on the building of new houses and Simms was appointed to the new role of Corporation housing architect. He immediately recruited staff to work in the department. In the sixteen years he was in the post he was responsible for the construction of 17,000 residences, including both flats and houses.

His work on flats showed influences by Michel de Klerk, Jacobus Oud and Johannes van Hardeveld.

Personal life
He married Eileen Clarke, daughter of Garda Superintendent Thomas Clarke on 30 September 1929.

Death
After Horace O'Rourke retired in 1945, the pressure on Simms increased.

He had already suffered one nervous breakdown fifteen years before and on 28 September 1948 he took his own life by throwing himself under a train at Dún Laoghaire. A suicide note said that he felt overwork was threatening his sanity. He was buried in Deans Grange Cemetery.

Notable works
St Audoen's House, Cook Street
Chancery Place Flats, Chancery Place (1935)
Countess Markiewicz House, Townsend Street
Greek Street Flats, Greek Street
Henrietta House, Henrietta Place
Oliver Bond flats, Oliver Bond Street (1936) - sometimes known as Oliver Bond House
Pearse House, Hanover Street East
Thorncastle Street Flats, Thorncastle Street, Ringsend

References

External links
  Herbert Simms City

20th-century English architects